Junodia is a genus of praying mantises native to Africa and represented by the following species:
Junodia amoena
Junodia beieri
Junodia congica
Junodia hararensis
Junodia lameyi
Junodia maternaschulzei
Junodia spinosa
Junodia stiewei
Junodia strigipennis
Junodia vansomereni
Junodia vansoni

See also
List of mantis genera and species

References

 
Mantodea of Africa
Hymenopodidae
Mantodea genera